The Railwaymen is the nickname of two English football (soccer) clubs: 
 Crewe Alexandra F.C., a professional football club in Crewe, Cheshire, England
 Leigh Genesis F.C., formerly known as Horwich Railway Mechanics Institute F.C. (Horwich RMI) and Leigh Railway Mechanics Institute F.C. (Leigh RMI), an English amateur association football club based in Leigh, Greater Manchester